Cuichapa is a municipality in Veracruz, Mexico.

Geography
Cuichapa is located in central zone of the State of Veracruz, about 90 km from state capital Xalapa. It has a surface of 69.92 km2. The municipality of Cuichapa is delimited to the north by Yanga, to the north-west by  Amatlán de los Reyes, to the south by Omealca, and to the west by Coetzala.

Climate
The weather in Cuichapa is warm-medium all year with rains in summer and autumn.

Agriculture
It produces principally maize and beans.

Society
The Patron of the town is San Isidro Labrador, who is honored with a celebration in May.

References

External links 

  Municipal Official webpage
  Municipal Official Information

Municipalities of Veracruz